Asclepias mexicana grows in the western United States and Mexico. It has been found in the U.S. in California, Washington, Oregon, Idaho, and Arizona.  A. mexicana Cav. can be distinguished by its whorled leaves, arranged in threes on the main stem and flowering branches and are rarely opposite.

References 

 
 
 

mexicana
Taxa named by Antonio José Cavanilles
Plants described in 1791
Flora of Mexico
[[Category:Taxa named by Antonio José Cavanilles]